Geoffrey Hebbe (fl. 1413–1423) of Chichester, Sussex, was an English politician.

He was a Member (MP) of the Parliament of England for Chichester in May 1413 and 1423.

References

14th-century births
15th-century deaths
English MPs May 1413
People from Chichester
English MPs 1423